Rubén Eduardo Bascuñán is a Chilean former footballer who last played in Antofagasta of the Second Division of Chile.

A product of Colo-Colo's youth system, he played mainly in lower-tier teams such as Deportes Colchagua of the third division of Chile, Provincial Osorno, Deportes Temuco, Everton, Antofagasta in two occasions, and Unión Española.

International career
Due to his good performances in Provincial Osorno, Bascuñán was part of the Chilean U-23 squad that failed to qualify to the 2004 Olympics.

External links
 BDFA profile

1982 births
Living people
Footballers from Santiago
Chilean footballers
Association football midfielders
Colo-Colo footballers
Everton de Viña del Mar footballers
C.D. Antofagasta footballers
Unión Española footballers
Provincial Osorno footballers